BSRA may refer to:

Bracken School Readiness Assessment, an individual cognitive test designed for children
British Society for Research on Ageing, a scientific society 
Boston Street Railway Association, a non-profit organization in Boston, Massachusetts dedicated to transportation history

Sports
Barbados Squash Rackets Association, see sport in Barbados
Botswana Squash Rackets Association
Brisbane Schoolgirls' Rowing Association, see Head of the River